Robin Armstrong (born 1953) is an alpine skier from New Zealand.

In the 1976 Winter Olympics at Innsbruck he did not finish in the Downhill, Slalom and Giant Slalom.

References

External links  
 
 

Living people
1953 births
New Zealand male alpine skiers
Olympic alpine skiers of New Zealand
Alpine skiers at the 1976 Winter Olympics